Surajpur is a village in the Punjab province of Pakistan. It is located at an altitude of 172 metres (567 feet).

References

Villages in Faisalabad District